A fruit allergy is a food allergy. Fruit allergies make up about ten percent of all food related allergies.

Types

There are many different types of fruits that people have been shown to react allergically such as mangoes and bananas. Some foods are clearly more allergenic than others. In adults, peanuts, tree nuts, finned fish, crustaceans, fruit, and vegetables account for 85% of the food-allergic reactions(O'Neil, Zanovec and Nickla).
People with allergies may have a hypersensitivity to the allergic food, which is what causes the allergic reaction. Most fruit allergies are oral syndrome allergies because they are consumed but may also be an external allergy if the fruit touches the skin.

Symptoms and signs
Allergic reactions to fruit and vegetables are usually mild and often just affect the mouth, causing itching, a rash, or blisters where the food touches the lips and mouth. This is called oral allergy syndrome. A number of people who react in this way to fruit or vegetables will also react to pollen from some trees and weeds. So, for example, people who are allergic to birch pollen are also likely to be allergic to apples.
Another symptom may include slight swelling in the throat, making it feel like it is closing.

Other symptoms due to hypersensitivity
The symptoms may vary depending upon the person, the severity of the allergy, and type of fruit. For example, mango allergy symptoms include hoarseness, dyspnoea and bronchitic rales (asthma) (Sareen and Shah). The duration of the symptoms tested by Saree and Shah were variable and ranged from 4 h [11] to 7 days [12]. The symptoms may appear within a few minutes.

Diagnosis

Skin prick testing is a common way of testing for an allergy. Other ways to test for allergies can be challenge testing, which consists in feeding a very small and measured amount of the allergen to the patient and monitor the reaction (O'Neil, Zanovec and Nickla). This should only be done by a doctor under surveillance.

Allergy or intolerance 
An allergy is different from an intolerance. Food allergies and food intolerances should not be confused because they do not contain the same risks and are not diagnosed the same way. Allergies can be fatal after only a small consumption, while intolerance, although uncomfortable, are not as deadly. An intolerance may lead to a nutrient deficiency which could cause death if untreated but the intolerance itself is not enough to cause rapid death. Allergies, with their varying symptoms, could cause instantaneous death if there is inflammation in the throat and causes suffocation.

Mitigation 
For those allergic to fruits, cooking may help reduce or eliminate the reaction to some fruits.

See also 
 List of allergies

References

External links
 Sareen and Shah. (2011). Hypersensitivity manifestations to the fruit mango. Asia Pacific Allergy. (44-49). Available at: http://www.apallergy.org/Synapse/Data/PDFData/9996APA/apa-1-43.pdf
 O'Neil, Zanovec and Nicklas. (2010). A Review of Food Allergy and Nutritional Considerations in the Food-Allergic Adult. American Journal of Lifestyle Medicine. (49-62). Retrieved from A Review of Food Allergy and Nutritional Considerations in the Food-Allergic Adult

Food allergies
Allergy